Rasuwillka (Quechua, hispanicized spelling Rasuhuilca) is a mountain in the Andes of Peru, about  high. It is located in the Ayacucho Region, Lucanas Province, Chipao District, and in the Sucre Province, Morcolla District. Rasuwillka lies northwest of Qarwarasu.

References

Mountains of Peru
Mountains of Ayacucho Region